The Piraeus Athena is a bronze statue dated to the fourth century BCE. It currently resides in the Archaeological Museum of Piraeus.

Description

The statue is an over-life sized representation of Athena, with a height of 2.35 meters (approximately 8 feet). She stands contraposto and wears a peplos that is open on the right side. She also wears a Corinthian helmet decorated with griffins on the sides of the helm and owls on the cheek pieces; the crest of the helmet has a serpent wrapped around its base. She also has an aegis strapped diagonally across her torso, which has a miniature Gorgon's head on it along with a border of snakes. The small size of the aegis indicate that it is likely to be a marker of Athena's identity than an actual piece of armament. The position of the lower right arm, reached out and palm up, indicates that she was originally holding something. Suggestions as to what it could have been include her holding out an owl, a small statue of Nike, or an offering bowl. The idea that the figure could have been an owl, however, is considered unlikely by Olga Palagia, based on the fact that no contemporary statues of a standing Athena show her holding an owl. Her left arm is posed to hold a spear. The cloth of the peplos appears heavy, as evidenced from the deep cloth lines in the sculpture. The attention to detail at the back of the statue and her slight stoop suggest a possibility that she was designed to be placed on a central pedestal rather than against a wall.

The Piraeus Athena has been determined to be an original, and currently the only existent statue thought to be based on it is the Athena Mattei currently in the Louvre, despite the position of the right arm on the Louvre statue being different.

Discovery

The Piraeus Athena was discovered in 1959, by workers who were drilling underground to install pipes. The excavation of the site was led by Ioannis Papademitriou, head of the Greek Archaeological Service, and Mastrokostas Euthymios, the Epimelete of Attica. The excavations uncovered an ancient warehouse that had been burned down, and which containing two groups of statues and other artefacts. Athena was found along with a not-quite-life-size bronze statue of Artemis, a large, bronze tragic mask, a herm, two bronze shields, two marble herms, and a small marble statue of Artemis Kindyas. The room the statue was found in was very close to the main harbour and the statues appeared to be packed ready to be shipped when the warehouse burnt down. The whole collection is now known as The Piraeus Bronzes.

There are several theories as to why the statue would be packed ready to be shipped. The first is based on the fact that Piraeus was captured by Sulla in 86 BC. This would suggest that the statues were being shipped in order to save them from the Roman attack. This in turn indicates that the original location of the statue may have been either in Piraeus itself, or locations in its vicinity - including the Port of Athens, which was nearby.

Other scholars, however, believe that the statue may have come from Delos. This identification is based on the fact that three of the statues found with the Piraeus Athena were of Artemis, who was believed to have been born at Delos. Further evidence for this suggestion is the capture of Delos by the romans in 88 BC. If this was the case the statues could have been part of the collection that Mithridates’ general had sent to Athens after the capture of the island. This theory is supported by the fact that a coin was also found somewhere near the statues with a date equivalent to 87/86 BC on it and a picture of King Mithridates VI.

Dating and Sculptor

Several pieces of evidence date the creation of the statue to around the late 4th Century. Firstly, several elements of the design of the statue also aid in dating its creation. One such element is the Corinthian helmet she wears - a style which became very popular in fourth century BC. A second factor is the style of the peplos worn by the statue. It depicts a heavy material - a style that became fashionable later during the second half of the fourth century, indicating a date range of the creation of the statue to that period.

There are currently two theories as to the maker of the statue. According to Geoffrey Waywall, the drapery bears similarities to a statue of Eirene holding a baby Ploutos which is thought to have been made by Cephisodotus the Elder. This identification is based on the fact that Pausanias states that Cephisodotus made a statue of Peace and Wealth for the Athenians. Pliny the Elder states that Cephisodotus was active during the 102nd Olympiad - equivalent to 372-368 BC. This tallies with the time period in which the Corinthian helmet and heavy peplos style were popular. Waywell identifies what he considers to be multiple areas of similarity between the two statues: 

Waywell points to details such as the way the falls of the drapery are disturbed by the position of the supporting foot, and the way the lifted leg is revealed through the peplos and its interactions with her knee, outer calf and ankle. Compare also the smoothness of the modelling of the free leg through the drapery, the heavy fold which falls from the knee. He also argues that the two statues share the same style of severe vertical folds in the clothing at the side and back.

Olga Palagia, however, argues that there is not much similarity between the style of the two statues:

Palagia rejects the evidence of the similarities between the skirt of the statues, arguing that it is unreliable due to the way in which copyists often blurred the original rendering. Instead, she highlights several differences between the styles of the two statues. Firstly, there are slight differences between the poses; secondly, there are further differences between other elements of the clothing of the two statues, such as the fact that the overfall of Athena's peplos hides most of her girdle from the front view, whereas the overfall of the peplos on Eirene has a short overfall that finishes just above the girdle, leaving the kolpos visible. 

Instead of Cephisodotus, Palagia suggests Euphranor as the sculptor, based on the similarity of the Piraeus Athena to the Apollo Patroos - another statue know to have been created by him. The two statues share similarities in how the skirt drapes over the bent leg and in the fullness of the faces. Further, both share the same type of stance - the raised arm is on the opposite side to the bent leg, though the bent leg and arm are the opposite between the two statues.  Euphranor was active during 104th Olympiad - equivalent to 364-361 BC, and thus also fits within the time frame afforded by the popularity of the Corinthian helmet and heavy drapery.

References

Sources

External links
Marble statue of Eirene
Statue of the Apollo Patroos
 Statue of the Artemis Kindyas found in the same excavation at Piraeus

4th-century BC Greek sculptures
Sculptures of Athena
Bronze sculptures in Greece
Sculptures in Piraeus
Ancient Greek bronze statues of the classical period
Statues in Greece
Sculptures of women in Greece
Archaeological Museum of Piraeus
Archaeological discoveries in Greece
1959 archaeological discoveries